Nachi may refer to:

Nachi, Iran, a village in Kurdistan Province, Iran
Nachi, Japan, now united with surrounding villages to form Nachikatsuura
Japanese cruiser Nachi, a cruiser of the Imperial Japanese Navy, named after the place
Nachi (worm), another name for the Welchia worm affecting Microsoft XP systems
Ñachi or ñache, a Mapuche food from Chile, prepared with fresh animal blood and dressings

People with the given name
Nachi Misawa (born 1989), Japanese rhythmic gymnast
Nachi Nozawa (1938–2010), Japanese voice actor, actor and theatre director

Japanese unisex given names